Robert White (born 23 April 1956) is a British sailor. He competed at the 1984 Summer Olympics and the 1988 Summer Olympics.

References

External links
 

1956 births
Living people
British male sailors (sport)
Olympic sailors of Great Britain
Sailors at the 1984 Summer Olympics – Tornado
Sailors at the 1988 Summer Olympics – Tornado
Sportspeople from Essex